Laguna Hills Technology Branch Library is one of two "technology branches" within the 33-branch Orange County Public Libraries (OCPL) system in Orange County, California.

History

The Library physically resides within the Laguna Hills Community Center and Sports Complex and has been operational since the center's grand opening on June 29, 2002.

Rather than maintaining extensive local collections of traditional library materials, this branch was designed to support public computer access while providing a modest circulating collection of books and magazines.

Technology

The Laguna Hills Technology Branch Library provides high speed Internet access from eighteen filtered and unfiltered public computer terminals which patrons can use to access the Internet and any of the library’s online subscription-based databases.  All workstations are also equipped with Microsoft Word, Excel, PowerPoint, Publisher, and Access. A black and white printer is available, copies cost 15 cents per page.Patrons can reserve computer time with an OCPL library card, which guarantees one hour of computer time per day.  Time extensions (up to two hours) are provided as availability allows.
Patrons are advised to bring their own USB flash drive if they want to save their work. For patrons who prefer to use their own laptops, the library also provides free Wi-Fi Internet access.

Collections

In addition to its computer workstations, the Laguna Hills Technology Branch Library offers a modest circulating collection of fiction and nonfiction books, including a special section of paleontology materials which relate to local fossil discoveries.  The branch also provides local and regional newspapers, popular magazines, and a selection of Spanish language materials for children and adults. As part of OC Public Libraries, Laguna Hills Technology Branch Library shares collection materials with the county’s other 33 branches.  Patrons are encouraged to browse the Online Public Access Catalog (OPAC) on-site or remotely via the Internet.  Any books, magazines, or audiovisual materials which are not physically available at the Laguna Hills Technology Branch Library can be delivered from another branch for a 25 cent fee.  Similarly, library materials may be returned to any other branch within the county system.
In addition to physical collection materials, OC Public Libraries provide digital eAudiobooks which are available for download to anybody with an OC Public Libraries card.

Services

The Laguna Hills Technology Branch Library offers a full-time reference staff, interlibrary loan service, Wi-Fi Internet access, and ongoing one-on-one basic computer training sessions.

The library also serves as a digital story center for the California of the Past program.  California residents and former residents are able to schedule a session with the digital story station where they can record their personal memories of life in California.

Literacy services are also available through Orange County’s READ/OC tutoring and training programs.

References

External links
 Laguna Hills Community Center

Libraries in Orange County, California
Laguna Hills, California
Public libraries in California